Milwaukee Road 1004 is a preserved 4-6-0 steam locomotive built by Baldwin Locomotive Works in September 1901 as a class B4 four-cylinder Vauclain compound locomotive for the Milwaukee Road who numbered it 385.

It was renumbered 1735 in 1907, and renumbered again in 1912 as 4335. Like most of the Milwaukee Road's Vaulclain compounds, it was rebuilt as a two-cylinder simple locomotive; for 4335 this happened in February 1920 when it was reclassified as class G8 and renumbered 2604. In the Milwaukee Road's 1938 renumbering, it received its last number — 1004. It was finally retired in April 1957.

The locomotive was mostly a freight locomotive while working on the Milwaukee Road; A Railroad article from around 1957 believed that Milwaukee Road 1004 was the last steam locomotive to retire and leave the system.

Today the 1004 is preserved non-operational at the Fairgrounds, in Austin, Minnesota. It is also the only surviving member of its class, and it is one of only five surviving Milwaukee Road steam locomotives.

References

1004
Standard gauge locomotives of the United States
Railway locomotives introduced in 1901
4-6-0 locomotives
Baldwin locomotives
Individual locomotives of the United States
Preserved steam locomotives of Minnesota